Key Lime Pie is a 1989 album by Camper Van Beethoven (CVB).  It was the band's final album before breaking up in 1990, although the band has reunited and released new material in recent years.  It was produced by Dennis Herring, who had also produced the band's previous album, Our Beloved Revolutionary Sweetheart.

Description
Key Lime Pie was the only Camper Van Beethoven album not to feature founding violinist/multi-instrumentalist/vocalist Jonathan Segel, who left the band before the album was recorded.  The band's core lineup on the album consisted of vocalist/rhythm guitarist/frontman David Lowery, bassist Victor Krummenacher, lead guitarist Greg Lisher and drummer Chris Pedersen.  Most of the violin parts were played by Don Lax, who was hired only for recording sessions and was not a band member.  Near the end of the recording of the album, violinist Morgan Fichter was hired as the replacement for Segel.  Fichter played only on the tracks "Opening Theme", "Pictures of Matchstick Men" and "Flowers," although she sings harmony vocals on a few other tracks and appears on the record's cover.  On the tour for the album, the band was also joined by steel guitarist/mandolinist/guitarist David Immerglück, a member of CVB's side project Monks of Doom.

Lowery has been quoted in interviews as saying that, although the entire band (save for Fichter) played on the basic tracks, Greg Lisher was the only other member to have contributed significantly to the album's recording, with most of the overdubbing and studio polishing having been done by Lowery, Lisher and producer Dennis Herring. Lisher's distinctive psychedelic lead guitar playing is arguably the album's most distinctive instrumental feature, although the band's use of violin also has a great influence on the sound of the record.

The album featured a darker lyrical outlook as compared to the band's previous record, although there is still a great deal of the band's trademark humor.  It was also the most political record that CVB had released, with tracks like "When I Win the Lottery," "Sweethearts" and "Jack Ruby" providing some humorous political and social commentary. Lowery said in an interview that "All Her Favorite Fruit" was based on the romance between Jessica Swanlake and Roger Mexico from the Thomas Pynchon novel Gravity's Rainbow.

It also featured less of the band's world music influence, although there are still elements of CVB favorites like ska and Eastern European music in songs like "Opening Theme" and "Borderline."  In place of the world-music influence, there are even more elements of Americana evident in many of the songs.  Psychedelia, another staple of the band's eclectic sound, is also very much in evidence, although songs like "The Light From a Cake" and "Flowers" feature a more-orchestrated, less-dissonant version of psychedelic music than did the band's earlier albums.

The album was CVB's most commercially successful record, with the Status Quo cover "Pictures of Matchstick Men" becoming an alternative rock hit and peaking at number one on the Billboard Alternative Songs chart.

Track listing
All songs written by Krummenacher/Lisher/Lowery/Pedersen, except where noted.

 "Opening Theme" – 2:21
 "Jack Ruby" – 5:22
 "Sweethearts" – 4:45
 "When I Win the Lottery" – 3:38
 "(I Was Born in a) Laundromat" – 3:43
 "Borderline" – 3:48
 "The Light from a Cake" – 2:43
 "June" – 4:24
 "All Her Favorite Fruit" – 5:14
 "Interlude" – 1:03
 "Flowers" (Lowery, Eric Curkendall, Chris Hart) – 2:58
 "The Humid Press of Days" – 2:44
 "Pictures of Matchstick Men" (Francis Rossi) – 4:08
 "Come on Darkness" – 3:14

2014 Omnivore Reissue 

 "Opening Theme" – 2:21
 "Jack Ruby" – 5:22
 "Sweethearts" – 4:45
 "When I Win the Lottery" – 3:38
 "(I Was Born in a) Laundromat" – 3:43
 "Borderline" – 3:48
 "The Light from a Cake" – 2:43
 "June" – 4:24
 "All Her Favorite Fruit" – 5:14
 "Interlude" – 1:03
 "Flowers" – 2:58
 "The Humid Press of Days" – 2:44
 "Pictures of Matchstick Men" (Rossi) – 4:08
 "Come on Darkness" – 3:14
 "Closing Theme (aka Guitar Hero)" - 2:27
 "(I Was Born in a) Laundromat" (Edit) - 3:05
 "Country 2" (Demo) - 2:42
 "Good Guys & Bad Guys" (Live) - 4:18
 "Wasted" (Live) (Ginn/Morris) - 1:35
 "Take The Skinheads Bowling" (Live) - 2:23
 "Before I Met You" (Live) (Seitz/Rader/Lewis) - 3:09
 "L'Aguardiente" (Soho Natural Session) - 4:59
 "(I Don't Want To Go To The) Lincoln Shrine" (Soho Natural Session) - 3:00

Personnel
 Tim Cook - pedal steel
 Davey Faragher - backing vocals 
 Morgan Fichter - violin, vocals
 Garth Hudson - organ, talking
 Victor Krummenacher - bass, vocals
 Don Lax - fiddle, strings
 Greg Lisher - guitar, vocals
 David Lowery - guitar, harmonica, keyboards, vocals
 Mary O'Neil - backing vocals 
 Chris Pedersen - percussion, drums, vocals
 Hammer Smith - harmonica
 Wally Sound - backing vocals
Technical
 Dennis Herring - producer, engineer
 Csaba Petocz - engineer, mixing
 Charles Paakkari - engineer, second engineer
 Peter Doell - second engineer 
 Shawna Stobie, Vince Zermeno, Mark Herman - mixing
 Howie Weinberg - mastering
Bruce Licher - design
Greg Allen, Andre Lansel - photography

Charts
Album - Billboard (United States)

Singles - Billboard (United States)

References

1989 albums
Camper Van Beethoven albums
Virgin Records albums
Albums produced by Dennis Herring